Harvey Alexander Logan (1867 – June 17, 1904), also known as Kid Curry, was an American outlaw and gunman who rode with Butch Cassidy and the Sundance Kid's infamous Wild Bunch gang during the late 19th and early 20th centuries. Despite being less well-known than his fellow gang members, he has since been referred to as "the wildest of the Wild Bunch", having reputedly killed at least nine law enforcement officers in five shootings and another two men in other instances. He was involved in numerous shootouts with police and civilians and participated in several bank and train robberies with various gangs during his outlaw days.

Early life

Logan was born in Richland Township, Tama County, Iowa in 1867. His mother died in 1876, and his brothers, Hank, Johnny and Lonny, moved to Dodson, Missouri to live with their aunt Lee Logan. Until at least 1883, Harvey made his living breaking horses on the Cross L ranch, near Rising Star, Texas. While there, he met and befriended a man named "Flat Nose" George Curry, from whom he took his new last name. His brothers soon adopted the same last name. The Logan brothers were known as hard workers until they got paid. Money did not stay in their pockets for long. They all had a taste for alcohol and women. Kid Curry would often return from a train or bank robbery, get drunk and lay up with prostitutes until his share of the take was gone. After Kid Curry became famous, the prostitutes would frequently name him as the father when they became pregnant. The children were referred to as "Curry Kids". It is believed that Kid Curry was credited with as many as eighty-five children, though the number of children he actually fathered was probably fewer than five. Descendants of the "Curry Kids" remain scattered throughout Eastland County, Texas and the surrounding areas to this day.

In 1883, Curry rode as a cowboy on a cattle drive to Pueblo, Colorado. While in Pueblo, he was involved in a saloon brawl. To avoid arrest, he fled, settling in southern Wyoming, where he began work at the "Circle Diamond" ranch. By all accounts, when sober, Curry was mild-mannered, likable, and loyal to both his friends and brothers.

Outlaw life

The events that changed the course of his life began when his brother Hank and friend Jim Thornhill bought a ranch at Rock Creek, in what was then Chouteau County, Montana (now Phillips County). The ranch was near the site of a mine strike made by local miner and lawman Powell "Pike" Landusky. Landusky, according to some reports of the day, confronted Curry and attacked him, believing Curry was involved romantically with his daughter Elfie. Landusky then filed assault charges against Curry, who was arrested and beaten .

Two friends of Curry's, A.S. Lohman and Frank Plunkett, paid a $500 bond for Curry's release. Landusky's daughter Elfie later claimed it was Curry's brother, Lonny, with whom she had been involved. However, the confession came much too late. On December 27, 1894, Curry caught Landusky at a local saloon and hit Landusky, stunning him. Curry, evidently believing the fight was over, began walking away. Landusky pulled his pistol and began threatening Curry, who was unarmed. Curry's friend and his brother's partner, Jim Thornhill, gave Curry his pistol. Landusky's gun jammed and Curry shot him dead.

Curry was arrested, but was released at an inquest when it was judged that he acted in self-defense. However, a formal trial was set. Curry believed he would not get a fair trial because the judge was close friends with Landusky. For this reason, Curry left town.

Riding with the Black Jack Ketchum gang
Curry started riding with outlaw Tom "Black Jack" Ketchum. Pinkerton detectives began trailing Curry shortly after his departure from Montana. In January 1896, Curry received word that an old friend of Landusky's, rancher James Winters, had been spying on him for the reward offered in his arrest. Curry and two of his brothers, Johnny and Lonny, went to Winters' ranch to confront him. However, a shootout erupted. Johnny was killed, while Curry and Lonny escaped. Shortly after, Curry and Lonny argued with Black Jack Ketchum over the take in a train robbery. The two brothers left the gang and joined the circus.

Forming his own gang
The brothers then received employment on a cattle ranch, arranged by their cousin, Bob Lee, near Sand Gulch, Colorado. Pinkerton agents trailing Curry gave up his trail briefly. Curry, Lonny, Walt Putnam and George Curry formed their own gang around this time. Curry temporarily left Colorado, intending to scout good targets for potential robberies. On April 15, 1897, Curry was reportedly involved in the killing of Deputy Sheriff William Deane of Powder River, Wyoming, as he and his gang gathered fresh horses on a ranch in the Powder River Basin. After this, he returned to Colorado to the ranch where he was working.

By June 1897, the cowboy job had ended, and Curry ventured north with the rest of the gang. They robbed a bank in Belle Fourche, South Dakota, and met resistance outside the bank from the townspeople. One of their friends, Tom O'Day, was captured when his horse spooked and ran away without him. The others escaped, but while planning a second robbery a posse from the town caught up with them in Fergus County, Montana. During a shootout, Curry was shot through the wrist, and his horse was shot from under him, resulting in his capture. George Curry and Walt Putnam were also captured. All three were held in the Deadwood, South Dakota jail, but only briefly; they overpowered the jailer and escaped. They headed back into Montana and robbed two post offices.

Riding with Butch Cassidy and the Wild Bunch
During this time Curry began riding with Butch Cassidy's Wild Bunch gang. On June 2, 1899, the gang robbed the Union Pacific Railroad Overland Flyer passenger train near Wilcox, Wyoming, a robbery that became famous. Many notable lawmen of the day took part in the hunt for the robbers, but they were not captured.

During one shootout with lawmen following that robbery, Kid Curry and George Curry shot and killed Converse County Sheriff Joe Hazen. Tom Horn, a noted killer-for-hire and contract employee of the Pinkerton Agency, obtained information from explosives expert Bill Speck that identified George Curry and Kid Curry as Hazen's murderers, which Horn passed on to Pinkerton detective Charlie Siringo. The gang escaped into its hideout at the Hole-in-the-Wall. Curry and the Sundance Kid may have used a log cabin, now preserved at Old Trail Town in Cody, Wyoming, as a hideout while planning to rob a bank in Red Lodge, Montana. However, they never robbed the Red Lodge bank and the Sundance Kid's participation has never been proven. Butch Cassidy, the Sundance Kid, and other desperados met at another cabin (also since brought to Old Trail Town) from the Hole-in-the-Wall country in north-central Wyoming. It was built in 1883 by Alexander Ghent.

Siringo had been assigned the task of bringing in the outlaw gang. He became friends with Elfie Landusky. Elfie was using the last name of Curry, alleging that Lonny Curry had got her pregnant. Through her, Siringo intended to locate the gang. Siringo changed his name to Charles L. Carter, disguised himself as an on-the-run gunman, and began mingling with people who might know the Currys, becoming friends with Jim Thornhill.

However, Kid Curry was hiding in Robbers Roost, another hideout used by the Wild Bunch in the remote canyon country of Utah. Curry then went to Alma, New Mexico, with Cassidy and others, intending to hide for a while. On July 11, 1899, while working at the W.S. Ranch, Curry robbed a Colorado and Southern Railroad train near Folsom, New Mexico with gang members Elzy Lay and Sam Ketchum, the brother of Tom "Black Jack" Ketchum. A posse led by Huerfano County, Colorado Sheriff Ed Farr cornered the gang near an area called Turkey Creek, which resulted in two gun battles over a period of four days. Lay and Ketchum were both wounded and later captured, with Lay killing the sheriff and mortally wounding Colfax County Deputy Henry Love in the process. Ketchum died from his wounds days later while in custody, and Lay received a life sentence for the murders. Curry escaped, but he, Cassidy, and other members of the gang were forced to leave New Mexico. Curry traveled to San Antonio, where he stayed briefly. While there he met prostitute Della Moore (also known as Annie Rogers or Maude Williams), with whom he became romantically involved. At the time of their meeting, she was working in Madame Fannie Porter's brothel, which was a regular hideout for the Wild Bunch gang.

Revenge killings
On February 28, 1900, lawmen attempted to arrest Lonny Curry at his aunt's home. Lonny was killed in the shootout that followed, and his cousin Bob Lee was arrested for rustling and sent to prison in Wyoming. Kid Curry was now the last surviving Logan brother. Meanwhile, Curry was identified in St. Johns, Arizona as he was passing notes suspected of being from the Wilcox robbery. Local Apache County Sheriff Edward Beeler gathered a posse and began tracking Curry, who was accompanied by Bill "News" Carver. The posse shot it out with Curry and Carver on March 28. Curry and Carver killed Deputy Andrew Gibbons and Deputy Frank LeSueur. On May 26, Kid Curry rode into Utah and killed Grand County Sheriff Jesse Tyler and Deputy Sam Jenkins in a brazen shootout in Moab. Both killings were in retaliation for Tyler and Jenkins having killed George Curry and his brother Lonny.

Curry then returned to the Wild Bunch. On August 29, 1900, they robbed Union Pacific train No. 3 near Tipton, Wyoming, from which newspaper stories claimed the gang got more than $55,000. The gang again split up, with Kid Curry and Ben Kilpatrick heading south to Fort Worth, Texas, while Cassidy, the Sundance Kid, and Bill Carver immediately pulled off another robbery in Winnemucca, Nevada.

Siringo, still working the case for the Pinkertons, was in Circleville, Utah, where Butch Cassidy had been raised. Curry rejoined the gang, and they hit a Great Northern train near Wagner, Montana, on July 3. This time, they took over $60,000 in cash. Gang member Bill Carver was killed in Sonora, Texas, by Sutton County, Sheriff Elijah Briant during the pursuit following that robbery.

Again the gang split up. In October 1901, Della Moore was arrested in Nashville, Tennessee, for passing money tied to an earlier robbery involving Curry. On November 5 and 6, gang members Ben Kilpatrick and Laura Bullion were captured in St. Louis, Missouri. On December 13, Kid Curry shot Knoxville, Tennessee, policemen William Dinwiddle and Robert Saylor in a shootout and escaped. Despite being pursued by Pinkerton agents and other law enforcement officials, Curry returned to Montana, where he shot and killed rancher James Winters, who was responsible for the killing of his brother Johnny years before.

Capture, escape, and death

Curry then traveled back to Knoxville. In a pool hall on November 30, 1902, Curry was captured after a lengthy physical fight with lawmen. He was convicted of robbery because facts in the murder of the two policemen were not definite and no witnesses would testify, and he received a sentence of 20 years of hard labor and a $5,000 fine. On June 27, 1903, Curry escaped. Rumors that a deputy had received an $8,000 bribe to allow his escape spread, but this was never proven.

On June 7, 1904, Kid Curry was tracked down by a posse outside of Parachute, Colorado. Curry and two others had robbed a Denver and Rio Grande train outside Parachute. As they escaped, they stole fresh horses owned by Roll Gardner and a neighbor. The next morning, when Gardner and the neighbor discovered their horses had been stolen, they set out in pursuit of the gang. They joined up with a posse and continued tracking the outlaws. The gang shot Gardner's and his neighbor's horses from under them; Gardner found cover while his neighbor started running. Kid Curry took aim at the neighbor and Gardner shot Curry. The wounded Curry decided to end it at that time, and fatally shot himself in the head to avoid capture. The other two robbers escaped. The rifle Gardner used is still in the family today. Rumors persist that Curry was not killed in Parachute and was misidentified, having actually departed for South America with Butch Cassidy and the Sundance Kid. Charlie Siringo resigned from the Pinkertons, believing they got the wrong man.

Curry is buried in Pioneer (Linwood) Cemetery overlooking Glenwood Springs, Colorado, a short distance from fellow gunfighter Doc Holliday's memorial.

In popular culture
Curry appears as a character in Mr American by George MacDonald Fraser. The novel, set in 1909, uses the controversy surrounding Curry's death to portray him as surviving the shootout near Parachute and later tracking the novel's protagonist, Mark Franklin, to England, where Curry attempts to kill Franklin.

Phillip Pine played Kid Curry in the episode "Kid Curry" on the TV series Tales of Wells Fargo (1959).

Ted Cassidy played Curry in the 1969 film Butch Cassidy and the Sundance Kid.

Ben Murphy portrayed a fictionalised Kid Curry in the 1970s television show Alias Smith and Jones.

The MythBusters tested the claim that Curry could drop a silver dollar off his hand and then draw and fire five shots from his revolver before it hit the ground. They found the claim to be highly unlikely.

Curry appears in the video game Call of Juarez: Gunslinger and is a boss-level duel opponent.

In 2015, Rocky Mountain Distilling + Bottling located in West Valley City, Utah began producing Kid Curry Vodka. In 2016, Kid Curry Silver Rum was released by the same company.

References

External links

 
 post-mortem photo
 Kid Curry, the Wildest of the Bunch, article by Beth Gibson

1867 births
1904 deaths
1904 suicides
19th-century American criminals
20th-century American criminals
American bank robbers
American people convicted of murder
Butch Cassidy's Wild Bunch
Cowboys
Deaths by firearm in Colorado
Fugitives
Gunslingers of the American Old West
Outlaws of the American Old West
People from Eastland County, Texas
Suicides by firearm in Colorado
Train robbers